AT&T Sports Networks, LLC (ATTSN) is a group of regional sports networks in the United States that primarily own and operate AT&T Sports Networks (founded in 2009, as Liberty Sports Holdings, later DirecTV Sports Networks, LLC). It is owned by Warner Bros. Discovery through its sports unit. Each of the networks carry regional broadcasts of sporting events from various professional, collegiate and high school sports teams (with broadcasts typically exclusive to each individual network, although some are shown on more than one AT&T-branded network within a particular team's designated market area).

In addition to carrying team and conference-related magazine, analysis and discussion programs exclusive to each region, most of the networks (with the current exception of AT&T SportsNet Southwest) also broadcast nationally distributed sports events, documentary and entertainment programs through a programming agreement with Bally Sports, which is the successor to Fox Sports Networks, a remnant of their former ownership under their previous corporate parents.

While previously operating under the FSN name, these four networks relaunched under the brand Root Sports on April 1, 2011, coinciding with the start of the Major League Baseball regular season. On July 14, 2017, following the acquisition of DirecTV by AT&T, the networks (besides Root Sports Northwest as it is majority-owned by the Seattle Mariners and minority-owned by Warner Bros. Discovery) were re-branded under the name AT&T SportsNet, coinciding with the second half of the 2017 Major League Baseball season. Collectively, the networks serve 13 million cable and satellite subscribers in 22 states. AT&T SportsNet master control operations are based in Atlanta, Georgia.

On February 24, 2023, Warner Bros. Discovery announced that it would leave the RSN business. Teams have until March 31 to reach an agreement to take their rights back or acquire the networks. If a deal is not reached by March 31, the channels will file for Chapter 7 bankruptcy.

History
On December 22, 2006, Liberty Media acquired four Fox Sports regional networks – FSN Utah, FSN Pittsburgh, FSN Northwest and FSN Rocky Mountain – as part of a deal with News Corporation, which exchanged the networks and its controlling 38.5% ownership interest in satellite provider DirecTV for US$550 million in cash and stock, in exchange for the 16.3% stake in News Corporation that had been owned by Liberty. These three FSN affiliates became part of the Liberty Entertainment division, which also owned a stake in the Game Show Network.

On May 4, 2009, DirecTV Group Inc. announced it would become a part of Liberty Entertainment, and spin off certain properties into a separate company under the DirecTV name, in a deal in which Liberty would increase its share in DirecTV from a minority 48% to a controlling 54%, while Liberty owner John Malone and his family would own a 24% interest. DirecTV would then operate the four acquired FSN-affiliated networks through DirecTV Sports Networks, a new division formed on November 19, 2009, upon the spin-off's completion.

In December 2010, DirecTV announced that it would rebrand its FSN affiliates collectively under the "Root Sports" brand. The new brand was created to emphasize connections between the network and fans who passionately support (or "root" for) their local teams. The networks would, according to Mark Shuken, president and chief executive officer of DirecTV Sports Networks at the time, have a "mindset" that "enables us to go from simply covering teams and games to providing an immersive experience as a fan and for the fan." The introduction of Root Sports was also intended to signify a form of independence from FSN; however, the Root Sports networks will maintain their current affiliations with the group through a programming agreement. The Root Sports brand was phased in on the networks during the first quarter of 2011, and officially replaced the channels' FSN branding (FSN Pittsburgh, FSN Northwest, FSN Rocky Mountain and FSN Utah) on April 1, 2011. The launch of Root Sports coincided with the opening weekend of the 2011 Major League Baseball season, as Root Sports holds broadcast rights for all of the MLB teams in their respective regions.

On August 6, 2014, DirecTV and AT&T (which was in the process of acquiring DirecTV) acquired Comcast SportsNet Houston – which had earlier been granted a Chapter 11 bankruptcy protection placement through an involuntary petition filed by Comcast and NBCUniversal in September 2013 – as a 60/40 joint venture (with DirecTV as majority owner). The network was subsequently rebranded as Root Sports Southwest on November 17, 2014, becoming the first Root Sports network to not be a rebranded Fox Sports Networks affiliate.

In April 2016, following the completion of the acquisition of DirecTV by AT&T, DirecTV Sports Networks rebranded under the AT&T name as AT&T Sports Networks. Following this announcement, the channels began to downplay the Root Sports brand by replacing their logo bugs with an AT&T Sports Networks logo, restricting the Root Sports brand to station identification only. Three of the channels were re-branded as AT&T SportsNet on July 14, 2017, introducing new logos and on-air graphics. Root Sports Northwest adopted the new AT&T SportsNet graphics, but remains under the Root Sports brand; it is the only network in the group that is not majority-owned by AT&T.

Following AT&T's acquisition of Time Warner in 2018, AT&T SportsNet was moved into the WarnerMedia News & Sports division in March 2019, alongside Time Warner's existing national sports unit Turner Sports.

In February 2020, the New York Post reported that AT&T had abandoned a plan to divest the channels, after only receiving bids in excess of $500 million (rather than the $1 billion valuation it had expected). In May 2021, it was announced that AT&T would instead divest the entirety of WarnerMedia, and contribute it into a joint venture with Discovery Inc., forming a new company later announced as Warner Bros. Discovery. Discovery announced on April 7, 2022, that Patrick Crumb, president of AT&T Sports Networks, would report to the yet-to-be-named Chairperson for Warner Bros. Discovery Sports; Jeff Zucker departed the company upon the completion of the merger, but his successor Chris Licht will only oversee CNN. The merger was completed the following day.

On February 24, 2023, Warner Bros. Discovery announced that it would leave the RSN business. The company sent messages to teams it has deals with, notifying them they have until March 31 to reach an agreement to take their rights back or acquire the networks. If a deal is not reached by March 31, the channels will file for Chapter 7 bankruptcy. Those teams with deals with Root Sports Northwest are not affected because that channel already is majority-owned by its teams.

Networks
The AT&T SportsNet group consists of three FSN-affiliated and one former CSN-affiliated sports network(s):

Related services

AT&T SportsNet Plus/ROOT Sports Plus
Currently, AT&T SportsNet Pittsburgh, AT&T SportsNet Southwest and ROOT Sports Northwest maintain alternate (or overflow) feeds under the AT&T SportsNet Plus or ROOT Sports Plus brand (with the network's regional name suffixed preceding the "Plus" title) for the broadcast of two or more events involving teams that the respective networks hold the broadcast rights to carry. These overflow feeds are available via digital cable, telco and satellite providers in their home markets, which may provide alternate programming when not used to carry conflicting scheduled game broadcasts.

Video streaming
Since 2017, AT&T SportsNet streaming is available to TV Everywhere authenticated subscribers. AT&T SportsNet Southwest will be added to FuboTV starting February 11, 2019, becoming the first over-the-top streaming service to provide any AT&T SportsNet channel

References

External links

 
Sports television networks in the United States
Television channels and stations established in 2009
Television channels and stations established in 2011
2011 establishments in Georgia (U.S. state)
Turner Sports
Warner Bros. Discovery networks
Former AT&T subsidiaries